Abantiades aurilegulus is a moth of the family Hepialidae. Samples have only been found in Western Australia.

References

Moths described in 1932
Hepialidae
Moths of Australia
Endemic fauna of Australia